Tlalixtaquilla de Maldonado   is one of the 81 municipalities of Guerrero, in south-western Mexico. The municipal seat lies at Tlalixtaquilla.  The municipality covers an area of 331.5 km².

In 2005, the municipality had a total population of 6534.

References

Municipalities of Guerrero